The Boeing Building (formerly known as the Boeing International Headquarters and previously to that as the Morton-Thiokol International Building) is a 36-floor skyscraper located in the Near West Side of Chicago. The building, at 100 North Riverside Plaza, is located on the west side of the Chicago River directly across from the downtown Loop. The building was designed with a structural system that uses steel trusses to support its suspended southwest corner in order to clear the Amtrak and Metra railroad tracks immediately beneath it.

The building was originally constructed for the Morton Salt Company in 1990, but became largely vacant a decade later after the company was acquired and downsized. Boeing moved its corporate headquarters there in 2001 when they opted to leave Seattle for Chicago. By 2021, with Boeing executives handling political and economical fallout from the Boeing 737 MAX groundings and the impact of the COVID-19 pandemic on aviation, Reuters reported that the shift in priorities rendered the building a "ghost town". Boeing ultimately announced the following year that it would move its corporate headquarters to Arlington, Virginia, where its defense division is located; the division relocated there from St. Louis in 2017.

Criticism

In a 2019 article, Jerry Useem criticized Boeing's move to Chicago, suggesting that by "isolating" the Boeing management from its engineering and manufacturing staff, the company discounted its former engineering-led corporate culture in favor of a management style run by MBAs instead of engineers.

See also

 Chicago architecture
 List of tallest buildings in Chicago
 List of towers

References

External links
Boeing official website
Emporis listing

Office buildings completed in 1990
Skyscraper office buildings in Chicago
Boeing
1990 establishments in Illinois
Corporate headquarters in the United States